Governor Swift may refer to:

Henry Adoniram Swift (1823–1869), 3rd Governor of Minnesota
Jane Swift (born 1965), Acting Governor of Massachusetts
William Swift (1848–1919), Naval Governor of Guam